Yuper Khine (born 31 January 1996) is a Burmese footballer who plays as a midfielder. She has been a member of the Myanmar women's national team.

References

1996 births
Living people
Women's association football midfielders
Burmese women's footballers
Sportspeople from Yangon
Myanmar women's international footballers